The 2016–17 Missouri Tigers women's basketball team represents the University of Missouri in the 2016–17 NCAA Division I women's basketball season. The Tigers were led by seventh year head coach Robin Pingeton. They play their games at Mizzou Arena and were members of the Southeastern Conference. They finished the season 22–11, 11–5 in SEC play to finish in a tie for fourth place. They lost in the quarterfinals of the SEC women's tournament to Texas A&M. They received an at-large to the NCAA women's tournament where they defeated South Florida in the first round before losing to Florida State in the second round.

Roster

Schedule and results

|-
!colspan=12 style="background:black; color:white;"| Exhibition

|-
!colspan=12 style="background:black; color:white;"| Non-conference regular season

|-
!colspan=12 style="background:black; color:white;"| SEC regular season

|-
!colspan=12 style="background:black; color:white;"| SEC Women's Tournament

|-
!colspan=12 style="background:black; color:white;"| NCAA Women's Tournament

Rankings
2016–17 NCAA Division I women's basketball rankings

See also
2016–17 Missouri Tigers men's basketball team

References

Missouri Tigers women's basketball seasons
Missouri
Missouri
Missouri Tigers
Missouri Tigers